Leonardo Romay  (born 29 April 1969 in Montevideo) is a former Uruguayan footballer.

International career
Romay made two appearances for the senior Uruguay national football team from 1995 to 1996.

References

 

1969 births
Living people
Uruguayan footballers
Uruguay international footballers
1997 Copa América players
Uruguayan Primera División players
Defensor Sporting players
Club Nacional de Football players
Association football goalkeepers
Footballers from Montevideo